Lateef is a 2005 Indian thriller film directed by Israr Ahmed and produced by Amina Ahmed under the Screenshot Media & Entertainment banner. It was released on 15 May 2015.

Cast
Nawazuddin Siddiqui as Lateef
Murli Sharma as Zafar Dongri
Mukesh Tiwari as ACP Sawant
Kader Khan as Police Commissioner Khan
Pratima Kazmi as Mafia Boss Lady
Akhilendra Mishra as Minister Narayan Dutt Agrawal (NDA)
Sudesh Berry as Drug-addict Ajeet
Pawan Singh
Raza Murad as Narrator

Plot
The plot of the movie revolves around the unholy nexus of Drug Mafia with Corrupt Politicians in power, and their constant struggle with honest police officers ACP Sawant and Commissioner Khan. An innocent and aspiring medical student Lateef is incorrectly implicated by Police in a drug-peddling case.
Lateef is convicted and awarded seven years imprisonment. After getting released from Jail, Lateef tries to search for his ex flame from his college days, who has now become a prostitute in red light area. Depressed and dejected Lateef turns to drugs and becomes a permanent addict.

ACP Sawant at the behest Commissioner Khan, arrests Zafar Dongri from one of his hideouts and then later on proceeds to arrest Minister Narayan Dutt Agrawal, whose own daughter Divya turns police witness in Social Worker Anand Kalsiwal and his son Jeet Kalsiwal's murder cases.

In the end, Lateef's friend Ajeet dies and is taken away by Municipal Hospital Ambulance. Lateef is reunited with his estranged sister and promises to never do drugs again. Minister Narayan Dutt Agrawal is shown taking oath again as a Minister, which infuriates ACP Sawant who is shown breaking his Television set.

Music
" Chain Milta Nahin" - Udit Narayan, Sadhna Singh, Shahid Mallya
"Dekhe The Kitne Sapne" - Kumar Sanu
"Kash Me" - Aishwarya Nigam, Sonika Sharma
"Rasme Mohabbat Ki" - Adnan Sami

References

External links
 
 

2015 films
2010s Hindi-language films
Indian thriller films
Films shot in Mumbai
2015 thriller films
Hindi-language thriller films